Larry Turley Wimmer (born December 8, 1935) is the Warren and Wilson Dusenberry University Professor at Brigham Young University (BYU).  He is a professor of economics who specializes in American economic history and the economics of aging.

Biography
Wimmer was born in Snowflake, Arizona.

Wimmer holds a bachelor's degree from BYU with an MA and Ph.D. from the University of Chicago.  He first joined the BYU faculty in 1963.  He was a Newcomen Society Fellow from 1975-1995.

Wimmer is a member of the Church of Jesus Christ of Latter-day Saints (LDS Church), for which he has served in various roles, including in a Sunday School presidency, as a High Priests group leader, as a ward executive secretary, as a Bishop, and in two Stake Presidencies.  He is married to the former Patricia Tischner Hansen.

Publications
Wimmer has written several works on economic history, many of which were written with Clayne L. Pope.  He also had written several works on the Kirtland Safety Society including The Kirtland Economy Revisited with Marvin S. Hill and C. Keith Rooker.  He has also written on the gold crises of 1869.

Letter to Martin Luther King
Wimmer wrote a letter stating his support for Martin Luther King in 1966, and asked Dr. King for any materials he could use to challenge claims from the "ultra-right" that Dr. King was a communist.  This letter was written 12 years before Wimmer's LDS Church gave equal rights to black members of the LDS Church.  Source:  http://www.thekingcenter.org/archive/document/letter-larry-t-wimmer-mlk

Sources

1935 births
American leaders of the Church of Jesus Christ of Latter-day Saints
Brigham Young University alumni
Brigham Young University faculty
Economic historians
People from Snowflake, Arizona
University of Chicago alumni
Living people
Latter Day Saints from Arizona
Latter Day Saints from Illinois
Latter Day Saints from Utah
Economists from Arizona